Karl Münich (born 27 August 1848, date of death unknown) was an Austrian fencer. He competed in the individual sabre event at the 1912 Summer Olympics in Stockholm.

References

External links
 

1848 births
Year of death missing
Austrian male sabre fencers
Olympic fencers of Austria
Fencers at the 1912 Summer Olympics